Mitsugi Dam  is a gravity dam located in Hiroshima Prefecture in Japan. The dam is used for flood control. The catchment area of the dam is 54 km2. The dam impounds about 34  ha of land when full and can store 5040 thousand cubic meters of water. The construction of the dam was started on 1973 and completed in 1988.

References

Dams in Hiroshima Prefecture